The 1964–65 Liga Bet season saw Hapoel Kiryat Shmona,  Beitar Kiryat Ono, Hapoel Kfar Shalem and Hapoel Rishon LeZion win their regional divisions and promoted to Liga Alef.

North Division A

North Division B

Hapoel Pardes Hanna withdrew from the league.

South Division A

South Division B

References
Kfar Shalem and Kiryat Ono promoted with Rishon LeZion to Liga Alef Davar, 21.6.65, Historical Jewish Press 
Hapoel Kiryat Shmona promoted to Liga Alef Davar, 28.6.65, Historical Jewish Press 
Postponed match in Liga Bet Heruth, 11.7.65, Historical Jewish Press 
Shefa-'Amr relegated to Liga Gimel Heruth, 4.7.65, Historical Jewish Press 
Postponed matches Heruth, 27.6.65, Historical Jewish Press 
ASA won without playing Maariv, 28.6.65, Historical Jewish Press 

Liga Bet seasons
Israel
3